Iliza Shlesinger: Confirmed Kills is a 2016 American stand-up comedy film directed by Bobcat Goldthwait and written by and starring Iliza Shlesinger, Iliza Shlesinger's third stand-up comedy special for Netflix, following War Paint from 2013 and Freezing Hot from 2015. In Confirmed Kills, Iliza talks about the Party Goblin, mermaids, ugly giants, Shark Tank and more.

Cast
 Iliza Shlesinger

Release
It was released on September 23, 2016 on Netflix.

References

External links
 
 
 

Netflix specials
Stand-up comedy concert films
Shlesinger, Iliza: Confirmed Kills
2016 films
2010s English-language films